Telecommunications Regulatory Authority  may refer to:

 Telecommunications Regulatory Authority of Bahrain
 Telecommunications Regulatory Authority of Lebanon 
 Telecom Regulatory Authority of India
 Nepal Telecommunications Authority
 Telecommunications Regulatory Authority (UAE)